Cameron Thane Muncey (born 8 February 1980) is an Australian guitarist and vocalist. He is the mainstay lead guitarist and one of the songwriters of Melbourne-based rock band Jet which formed in 2001. Muncey co-wrote many of Jet's hits with Nic and Chris Cester, including  "Are You Gonna Be My Girl", "Radio Song", "Put Your Money Where Your Mouth Is" and "Cold Hard Bitch".

Biography
Muncey was born in Melbourne, and attended St Bedes College (high school) with future bandmates Nic and Chris Cester. Muncey took up guitar after hearing "Sunshine Of Your Love" by Cream.  The song "Timothy" from "Get Born" was written about an older brother named who died in infancy before Muncey was born. Muncey and Nic Cester became best friends at school, with Cester declaring "He had 'Led Zeppelin' written on his bag, and so did I, so it was inevitable, I guess", on the band's documentary recorded on their DVD, Right! Right! Right!.

Muncey's trademark guitar for Get Born was a Gibson Flying V, and he has used it in concert and in many of the videos. He has since switched to Gibson Les Pauls and SGs. Since Shaka Rock, Muncey mainly plays a Gibson ES137. Muncey uses Marshall amps as seen in the "Are You Gonna Be My Girl" video, as well as Orange Amplification as seen in the "Take it or Leave it" video. In the video for "Are You Gonna Be My Girl" he can be seen wearing an AC/DC T-shirt.

In addition to playing lead guitar, Muncey sings lead vocals on a number of Jet's songs, including "Hey Kids", "Radio Song" and more recently "She Holds A Grudge".

Muncey married his girlfriend Sarah Rumbelow, on 18 August 2009.

APRA Awards
The APRA Awards are presented annually from 1982 by the Australasian Performing Right Association (APRA).

|-
|rowspan="2"| 2006 || "Are You Gonna Be My Girl" – Nicholas Cester, Cameron Muncey || Most Performed Australian Work Overseas || 
|-
| "Cold Hard Bitch" – Nicholas Cester, Christopher Cester, Cameron Muncey || Most Performed Australian Work Overseas || 
|-
| 2007 || "Are You Gonna Be My Girl" – Nicholas Cester, Cameron Muncey || Most Performed Australian Work Overseas ||

References

General
 
  Note: [on-line] version established at White Room Electronic Publishing Pty Ltd in 2007 and was expanded from the 2002 edition.

Specific

External links
JET official website
JET at MySpace

1980 births
APRA Award winners
Australian rock guitarists
Jet (band) members
Lead guitarists
Living people
21st-century guitarists
Musicians from Melbourne